Carol Wilson is an American operatic soprano and a principal artist at the Deutsche Operam Rhein since 1998.

Wilson attended Iowa State University and received Doctor of Musical Arts degree from Yale School of Music. Wilson has played several roles, including Agathe in Der Freischütz, Alice Ford in Falstaff, the Countess in Capriccio, Elisabeth in Tannhäuser, Eva in Die Meistersinger von Nürnberg, Fiordiligi in Cosi fan tutte, Leonore in Fidelio, Senta in Der fliegende Holländer, and the title heroines in Alcina, Ariadne auf Naxos, L'incoronazione di Poppea, and Iphigénie en Tauride. Her 2009 performances at the house include Countess Almaviva in Le nozze di Figaro, Donna Elvira in Don Giovanni, the Empress in Die Frau ohne Schatten, Freia in Das Rheingold, Gutrune in Götterdämmerung, the Marschallin in Der Rosenkavalier, Ortlinde in Die Walküre, and La Speranza/La Musica in L'Orfeo.

As a guest artist, Wilson has performed at the Caramoor Festival, the Connecticut Early Music Festival (Elisa in Il re pastore), Oper Frankfurt (Eva), the Royal Opera Stockholm (Marie/Marietta in Die tote Stadt),  the Savonlinna Opera Festival (Eva), the Staatstheater Bonn (Ariadne and Leonore), the Staatstheater Nürnberg (Alcina), the Staatsoper Stuttgart (Alcina), Theater Lübeck (Tatyana in Eugene Onegin) and the Vancouver Opera (the Marschallin and Agathe). She has also performed in concerts with the American Symphony Orchestra, the Boston Masterworks Chorale, the Brooklyn Philharmonic (concert performances of Violetta in La Traviata and Micaela in Carmen), the International Congress for Medieval Music, the Norfolk Chamber Music Festival, the Orchestra of St. Luke's (as Maria in concert performances of West Side Story and in Handel and Haydn operas), the Topeka Symphony Orchestra, the University of Chicago Contemporary Chamber Players, and the Rocky Mountain Festival for Contemporary Music.

References

American operatic sopranos
Iowa State University alumni
Living people
Year of birth missing (living people)
21st-century American women